The Alcock Scout, a.k.a. A.1 and Sopwith Mouse, was a curious "one-off" experimental fighter biplane flown briefly during World War I.  It was assembled by Flight Lieutenant John Alcock at Moudros, a Royal Naval Air Service base in the Aegean Sea. Alcock took the forward fuselage and lower wings of a Sopwith Triplane, the upper wings of a Sopwith Pup and the tailplane and elevators of a Sopwith Camel, and married them to a rear fuselage and vertical tail surface of original design (presumably by Alcock himself). It was powered by a 110 hp Clerget 9Z engine, and carried a .303 Vickers machine gun.

Affectionally referred to as the 'Sopwith Mouse' by Alcock and his fellow designers, Alcock never flew it himself, but squadron-mate FSL Norman Starbuck made a few flights in it, the first on 15 October 1917. However, it crashed in early 1918, was written off and never flew again.

Specifications (approximate)

Notes

Citations

References
 
 
 

1910s British fighter aircraft
Sesquiplanes
Rotary-engined aircraft
Aircraft first flown in 1917